Monstercat (formerly known as Monstercat Media) is a Canadian independent electronic music record label based in Vancouver, British Columbia.

Founded in 2011 by Mike Darlington and Ari Paunonen, the label releases regular compilation albums featuring music from various artists, beginning with the release of its first compilation album, Monstercat 001 – Launch Week. Until the release of Monstercat 030 – Finale in 2017, each compilation was given a name and depicted the story of the aforementioned mascot in the album cover. This preceded a rebranding of the label, with a new series of albums titled Monstercat Uncaged. In 2018, Monstercat introduced a new brand titled "Instinct". In 2021, Monstercat acquired electronic label Silk Music to form a third brand titled "Monstercat Silk". The compilations ended the same year with the release of Monstercat Uncaged Vol. 11.

Monstercat has featured many notable artists, including Pegboard Nerds, Vicetone, and Seven Lions. Monstercat has also released soundtrack albums for various video games, including Fortnite, Rocket League and Beat Saber.

The label is best known for the 2016 release of the song "Alone" by American DJ Marshmello, which reached Platinum status in the United States and Canada in 2017 and 2018, respectively. The April Fool's Day release of "Crab Rave" by Irish music producer Noisestorm became an internet meme for months after its release.

History

Founding (2011–2012) 
Monstercat Media was founded on 1 July 2011 by Mike Darlington (born 1989) and Ari Paunonen (born 1989/90), two university students from Waterloo, Ontario. The label's YouTube channel, which served as a medium to promote their friends and their music, was created the same day, and began a tri-weekly upload schedule in October. The young students were later responsible for the creation of the label's uniform compilation albums.

The team moved to their current offices in Vancouver in 2012 after Darlington and Paunonen finished school.

Building the label, first tour, and Marshmello (2013–2016) 
In July 2014, Monstercat surpassed one million in record sales across the label. When asked about the label's model, Darlington said:People don't need record labels anymore. Artists can do everything on their own. So we either had to do it for them better or provide a platform and marketing tool they can't find on their own. That's where the community concept came for Monstercat. We created a brand that fans can use to discover music and [that] artists can use as a platform for getting their music out there.

In August 2014, Monstercat published a manifesto calling for the reform of copyright law. In it, they described their desire to allow musicians more freedom in sampling other musicians' recordings.

In December 2014, Monstercat launched Monstercat FM as part of live-streaming service Twitch's start in music broadcasting. Monstercat FM is a 24/7 radio station-like Twitch stream featuring many of Monstercat's releases from throughout their history as a label. The launch event for the stream was a DJ set by Monstercat artist Stephen Walking. Monstercat FM was eventually added to YouTube and Microsoft-owned live-streaming website Mixer.

Since 2015, Monstercat has participated in multiple music festivals. One such festival was the Amsterdam Dance Event. Billboard described their 2015 show as "a three-hour mixer outing".

In May 2016, Monstercat signed American producer Marshmello's single, "Alone". Its music video has amassed over 2 billion views combined across YouTube, including a label record 161 million views on Monstercat's YouTube channel  These views contributed to the artist earning $21 million the year after the video's release.

Partnerships, awards and evolution (2017–2020) 
In June 2017, Monstercat partnered with Psyonix to promote the second anniversary of the video game Rocket League by releasing Rocket League x Monstercat Vol. 1, an 18-song album from artists who had previously signed songs to Monstercat, including Slushii, Aero Chord and Vicetone. The album was released on 5 July 2017. Monstercat also announced their own television channel, Monstercat TV, on the Pluto TV television platform the same month.

In July 2017, Monstercat won DJ Mags Best Breakthrough Label, competing against other labels such as Discwoman, Tuskegee Music, Perspectives Digital and Honey Soundsystem. Monstercat has hosted an annual block party near their headquarters, "Monstercat Compound", since 2017.

In November 2017, Monstercat received the label's first certified platinum record for the 2016 song "Alone" by Marshmello. In an email to Billboard, Mike Darlington expressed his gratitude towards the collaboration and expressed his praisal for Marshmello's success.

In December 2017, Monstercat was named one of the five best independent dance labels of 2017 by Billboard.

On the week of 1 January 2018, Monstercat announced a split in branding into two distinct themes, "Uncaged" and "Instinct", citing the diversity of their music library. This was accompanied by the creation of a separate channel, named Monstercat: Instinct. The Instinct brand features music that has a prominent focus on melodic aspects, including genres such as house and future bass. The change included a retirement of the tri-weekly release schedule in favour of a release schedule of four times a week and a podcast episode in-between.

In another first for the label, 9 August saw a collaborative single with Sumerian Records. Called "Kneel Before Me", produced by Slander and Crankdat, and featuring Asking Alexandria, the single was praised across both the electronic and rock music industries.

In September 2018, two weeks before Rocket League x Monstercat Vol. 4 released, Gavin Johnson, Head of Gaming for Monstercat, spoke of the collaboration between the label and Psyonix:
I met Josh Watson (Esports Operations Manager of Psyonix) at one of our Monstercat gaming-driven events during E3 of 2016. Shortly after, Josh introduced me to their Audio Director Mike Ault as he had a vision for how he wanted to approach music in Rocket League which mirrored that of our ethos with Monstercat. During our first call, it was clear that we shared the same desire to build new platforms for exhibiting artists to be on and grow. The groundwork Rocket League x Monstercat Vol. 1 begun immediately afterwards.

In November 2018, Noisestorm's April Fools' Day single, "Crab Rave", entered Billboards Dance/Electronic Songs chart. The Irish music artist, writing to the magazine, praised its entrance onto the chart, and expressed his approval of its status as an internet meme.

Other partnerships 
In 2019, Monstercat partnered with Dutch video game developer Soedesco to compose music for its video game, Xenon Racer. The game was released on 26 March of that year.

On 14 March 2019, Czech-based indie studio Beat Games released their first paid Downloadable content (DLC) song pack for their virtual reality rhythm game Beat Saber for Microsoft Windows and PlayStation 4. The song pack was released as a partnership with Monstercat, titled Monstercat Music Pack Vol. 1. It features a collection of 10 tracks from the record label, including songs from Aero Chord, Pegboard Nerds, Muzzy, Stonebank and Kayzo. The song pack was released for $12.99 USD, (or $1.99 per individual track), with Monstercat offering new subscribers a free month of their Gold Subscription. A crossover music pack with Rocket League was released in November 2019.

In July 2019, to coincide with the label's eighth anniversary, Monstercat announced a partnership with Linden Labs to bring live music experiences into the developer's virtual reality game, Sansar. The collaboration, called the Monstercat: Call of the Wild Experience, began on 12 July, and hosts a live virtual reality alternative to Monstercat's weekly Call of the Wild radio show.

Acquisition of Silk Music (2021–present) 

On 9 February 2021, Monstercat announced that they had acquired progressive house label Silk Music to form a third brand under the Monstercat label, titled "Monstercat Silk". The brand was promoted to focus on the progressive aspect of electronic music, continuing its signature style of progressive house and trance among similar genres. In the deal, Silk Music director Jacob Henry retained his directorial position with the brand. Silk Music's YouTube channel and social media accounts were rebranded to "Monstercat Silk" alongside the announcement (with Monstercat retaining Silk's 24/7 YouTube streams and the Silk Music Showcase radio show), while Monstercat also announced that with the acquisition, they would be moving to having 6 releases a week, with each brand having 2 releases a week.

On 17 September 2021, Monstercat and Westwood Recordings released an eight-track collaborative compilation album titled Compound 2021, featuring artists such as The Funk Hunters, Kotek, and Defunk. It also coincides with the fourth year of the Monstercat Compound block party after a hiatus in 2020, which took place a day after the release of the compilation.

Key people
 Mike Darlington – co-founder, chief executive officer
 Ari Paunonen – co-founder, chief operating officer
 Jonathan Winter – director of A&R
 Chelsea Shear – Lead A&R
 Conor Systrom – promotional manager
 Gavin Johnson – head of gaming
 Ben Brown Bentley – head of events
 Daniel Turcotte – commercial director
 Jacob Henry – director and founder, Monstercat Silk

Artists

Monstercat signs artists on a single-track basis, allowing them to move between labels and brands without an exclusive contract.

Monstercat has supported prominent artists such as Krewella, Gareth Emery, Knife Party, Modestep, Seven Lions, and Infected Mushroom. Other producers with connections to the label include:

Au5: First appeared on the label with the song "Sweet", a collaboration with I.Y.F.F.E and Auratic, later releasing the two track EP Blossom as his first solo release. He collaborated frequently with Fractal until the release of Ison, when he took a brief hiatus from releasing music under Monstercat until he returned to the label with the song "The Journey".
Ephixa: Debuted on the label as its first official artist with his song "Dubstep Killed Rock 'n' Roll" in mid-2011. Ephixa had left the label in late 2012, continuing to release music independently. In a Reddit AMA, the Monstercat staff were asked what happened to him and they responded: "Ephixa, as an artist, took some time off to focus on other projects and his personal life. However, word on the street is that he is back at producing and we are looking forward to hearing his new work". In mid-2016, Ephixa returned to the label and has since continued to release music through Monstercat.
Haywyre: Martin Vogt first released his song "Synergy" on Monstercat in 2013, after American electronic music artist Fractal recommended that Vogt send his music to Monstercat's head of A&R as they might be interested in signing the song to the label. Haywyre has since released two full-length albums through the label, Two Fold Pt. 1 in 2014 and Two Fold Pt. 2 in 2016. His first album, "Two Fold Pt. 1", was ranked as the fifth and ninth best album of 2014 by EDM Sauce and Your EDM websites respectively.
Hellberg: A Swedish house producer from Stockholm, Jonathan Hellberg debuted on the label with his single "Stockholm". His prominent releases include "The Girl", featuring vocalist and actor Cozi Zuehlsdorff, and "Synchronize", featuring New York singer Aaron Richards. A music video for "Synchronize" has been released by the label.
Nitro Fun: Born in 1998, Mexican producer Gustavo "Gus" Rangel became the youngest artist signed to Monstercat when he made his debut with his 2013 remix of Televisor's "Old Skool", before debuting his first original singles, "New Game" (featured on 016 – Expedition) and "Cheat Codes" (featured on 017 – Ascension), in early 2014. He released the track "Checkpoint" in a collaboration with Hyper Potions in 2016, which was featured in the trailer for the video game Sonic Mania.
Pegboard Nerds: They first appeared on Monstercat in 2012 with their song "Gunpoint". This duo, composed of Alexander Odden and Michael Parsberg, have since released thirteen extended plays through the label, including Guilty Pleasures in 2013 and Nerds by Nature in 2017. Their 2015 extended play Pink Cloud was released to help fund breast cancer research and charted at number nine on the Billboard Top Dance/Electronic Albums and at number twenty on the Billboard Heatseekers charts.
Project 46: Thomas Shaw and Ryan Henderson, two friends who met via Skype, first joined the label in 2011. Mike Darlington convinced them to join in an effort to diversify Monstercat's then dubstep-heavy catalogue. The duo has since released two extended plays through the label—Continuum in 2013 and Summer Feels in 2016.
Unlike Pluto: Debuted on the label with "Waiting For You", Armond Arabshahi has released six singles with Monstercat, including "Everything Black", which was praised by music outlets. In 2017, Arabshahi left the label due to creative differences, as he was pursuing a different artistic direction at the time.
Varien: Debuted as one of the first artists on the label under the alias Halo Nova, Varien has since released various albums and extended plays via the label, including Mirai Sekai (with 7 Minutes Dead) in 2014, The Ancient & Arcane in 2015 and My Prayers Have Become Ghosts in 2016.

Discography

Main series compilations

Uncaged
 Monstercat Uncaged Vol. 1 (2017)
 Monstercat Uncaged Vol. 2 (2017)
 Monstercat Uncaged Vol. 3 (2017)
 Monstercat Uncaged Vol. 4 (2018)
 Monstercat Uncaged Vol. 5 (2018)
Monstercat Uncaged Vol. 6 (2019)
Monstercat Uncaged Vol. 7 (2019)
Monstercat Uncaged Vol. 8 (2020)
Monstercat Uncaged Vol. 9 (2020)
Monstercat Uncaged Vol. 10 (2020)
Monstercat Uncaged Vol. 11 (2021)

Instinct
 Monstercat Instinct Vol. 1 (2018)
 Monstercat Instinct Vol. 2 (2018)
 Monstercat Instinct Vol. 3 (2019)
 Monstercat Instinct Vol. 4 (2019)
 Monstercat Instinct Vol. 5 (2020)
 Monstercat Instinct Vol. 6 (2020)
 Monstercat Instinct Vol. 7 (2021)

Rocket League x Monstercat series

 Rocket League x Monstercat Vol. 1 (2017)
 Rocket League x Monstercat Vol. 2 (2018)
 Rocket League x Monstercat Vol. 3 (2018)
 Rocket League x Monstercat Vol. 4 (2018)
 Rocket League x Monstercat Vol. 5 (2018)
 Rocket League x Monstercat – Legacy (2020)

Other select compilations 
 Monstercat 5 Year Anniversary (2016)
 Monstercat 8 Year Anniversary (2019)
 Monstercat - 9 Year Anniversary (2020)
 Monstercat 10 Year Anniversary (2021)
 Compound 2021 (2021)

Accolades and awards

References

External links
 
 Monstercat on YouTube
 Monstercat discography on Bandcamp

 
2011 establishments in Ontario
Canadian independent record labels
Electronic dance music record labels
Music of Vancouver
Music-related YouTube channels
Record labels established in 2011
Record labels in Vancouver